A 6-inch howitzer is a howitzer with a 6-inch bore. Examples include:

BL 6-inch 26 cwt howitzer
BL 6-inch 30 cwt howitzer
6 inch field howitzer M-1908

See also
:Category:155 mm artillery, for other weapons that could be described as "6-inch" howitzers

152 mm artillery